KSSZ (93.9 FM) is a radio station broadcasting a talk radio format. Licensed to Fayette, Missouri, United States, the station serves the Columbia, Missouri, area.  The station is currently owned by Zimmer Radio Group of Mid-Missouri. The station also airs on translator K242CT on 96.3 FM.

History

1994-1996: Adult Contemporary 
The station signed on July 15, 1994, initially licensed to Boonville, Missouri, and featured a Soft Adult Contemporary format as "Lite FM 93.9." At the time, however, the station only broadcast with 6,000 watts. After upgrading to 25,000 watts, the station became known as "Lite 93.9" and "93.9 K-Lite" while still airing the same Soft Adult Contemporary format. Big Country of Missouri initially owned the station. Zimmer Radio bought the station in September 1996.

1996-1998: Classic Rock 
In 1996, the station adopted a Classic rock format with the call letter KLSC. The format was initially successful, but a 1998 realignment of Zimmer Radio's Mid-Missouri stations sent much of the classic rock programming to co-owned KCMQ. Around 1996, the station changed its city of license to Fayette and upgraded from 6kw to 25kw.

1998-2001: Adult Contemporary 
The frequency returned to an Adult Contemporary format, this time as "Mix 93.9," still with the KLSC call letters.

In December 1999, the station became "Kiss 93.9" and featured an oldies-heavy Soft Adult Contemporary format, adopting the KSSZ call letters. "Kiss 93.9" failed to gain traction in the market, largely due to a lack of promotion and the heavily-automated format, which utilized personalities recorded from Seattle, Washington.

In the weeks following September 11, 2001, the station broadcast an all-news format, largely featuring the audio from Fox News Channel. In October of that year "Kiss 93.9" briefly returned to its previous format.

2001-present: Talk 
In the fall of 2001, the station became "The Eagle 93-9" featuring a talk radio format. It has become the longest-lasting, most stable and most competitive format in the frequency's history.

References

External links
Zimmer Communications Radio Stations

SSZ
Radio stations established in 1993
1993 establishments in Missouri
Howard County, Missouri
Talk radio stations in the United States